The 1982 VMI Keydets football team was an American football team that represented the Virginia Military Institute (VMI) as a member of the Southern Conference (SoCon) during the 1982 NCAA Division I-AA football season. In their 12th year under head coach Bob Thalman, the team compiled an overall record of 5–6 with a mark of 2–3 in conference play, placing sixth in the SoCon.

Schedule

References

VMI
VMI Keydets football seasons
VMI Keydets football